INS Chennai (D65) is the third and last ship of the stealth guided missile destroyers of the Indian Navy. She was constructed by the Mazagon Dock Limited (MDL) at Mumbai. On 17 April 2017, INS Chennai was dedicated to the city of Chennai in presence of then Chief Minister of Tamil Nadu, K. Palaniswamy.

INS Chennai has on her seal a Bull symbolising the Jallikattu festival celebrated in Tamil Nadu from where the ship associates its heritage.

Construction
She was laid down in February 2006, and was launched on 2 April 2010 by the then Defence Minister AK Antony's wife Elizabeth Antony at a function in Mumbai, and was commissioned on 21 November 2016 by the Indian Defence Minister Manohar Parrikar. INS Chennai is the first naval ship named after Chennai, capital city of the state of Tamil Nadu, India.

Features
The India-designed ship is designed to have state of the art weapons and sensors, stealth features, an advanced action information system, a comprehensive auxiliary control system, world class modular living spaces, sophisticated power distribution system and a host of other advanced features. These ships integrate many new features and involve design changes that ensure a far more advanced weapons platforms compared to the earlier Project 15 ships.

The ship's air defence capability, designed to counter the threat of enemy aircraft and anti-ship cruise missiles, revolve around the vertical launch, long range surface-to-air missile system, co-developed by DRDO.

Four AK-630 rapid-fire guns will provide the ship with close-in-defence capability while an MR gun will enable her to provide effective naval gunfire support.

India-developed twin tube torpedo launchers and rocket launchers will add punch to the ship's anti-submarine capability.

INS Chennai is designed to carry the supersonic BrahMos surface-to-surface missile system. The system enables the ship to engage shore-based and naval surface targets at long range making it a lethal platform for strike against enemy targets.

Cooperative Engagement Capability
On 15 May 2019, INS Chennai along with INS Kochi participated in the maiden cooperative engagement firing through the employment of the full Joint Taskforce Coordination (JTC) mode which implements the MRSAM / Barak 8 'Cooperative Engagement' operating mode.

Notable Deployments
INS Chennai, along with INS Sunayna was sent to the Persian Gulf and Gulf of Oman in June 2019 to protect Indian shipping interests amid tensions in the Strait of Hormuz.

Gallery

See also
 - Sister ship and first of the class.
 - Sister ship and second of the class.

References

Kolkata-class destroyers
Destroyers of the Indian Navy
Ships built in India
2010 ships